Banamalipur  is a village in Chanditala I community development block of Srirampore subdivision in Hooghly district in the Indian state of West Bengal.

Geography

Gram panchayat
Villages and census towns in Masat gram panchayat are: Aushbati, Azabnagar, Banamalipur, Chhunche, Krishnanagar and Masat.

Demographics
As per 2011 Census of India Banamalipur had a total population of 3.443 of which 1,813 (53%) were males and 1,630 (47%) were females. Population below 6 years was 338. The total number of literates in Banamalipur was 2,695 (86.80% of the population over 6 years).

Transport
The nearest railway station, Baruipara railway station, is on the Howrah-Bardhaman chord, which is a part of the Kolkata Suburban Railway.

The main road is 31 Number Road. It is the main artery of the village and it is connected with Ahilyabai Holkar Road (Sehakhala), National Highway 19 (Bora), State Highway 13 (Milki Badamtala) and State Highway 6/ G.T. Road (Nabagram).

There is 31 Number Private Bus from Jangipara bus stand to Serampore bus stand via Furfura Sharif, Sehakhala, Banamalipur, Gangadharpur, Baruipara, Bora and Milki Badamtala.

Bramha Datta Dham
Shri Narayan Maharaj (Anna) is a Sadguru from Narayanpur, Pune. The motto of Sadguru Narayan Maharaj is to awaken humanity in humans "माणसातला माणूस जागा करणे". Narayan Maharaj is building "Char DattaDhams" in four different directions in India, of which 2 Dhams have already been completed.
First of the Char Dattadhams has been constructed in Madhya Pradesh "Shiva Datta Dham, Jalkoti, Maheshwar, Khargone Shiv Datta Dham, Jalkoti, Maheshwar, Madhya Pradesh" 
Second of the Char Dattadhams is in Kanyakumari Anusaya Datta Dham, Vattakottai, Kanyakumari"Anusaya Datta Dham, Vatta-kottai Vattakottai Fort, Anju Gramam, Kanyakumari". 
Third of the Char Dattadhams is near Kolkata "Bramha Datta Dham" and it is under construction situated in Bramha Datta Dham, Baruipara, Kolkata"Baruipara". This will be the largest Hindu temple in West Bengal.
Shri Atri Dattadham, Himachal Pradesh

References

Villages in Chanditala I CD Block